Nyaunggyin is one of the 37 nats in the Burmese pantheon of nats. He was a descendant of the captive King Manuha of Thaton. He died of leprosy during the reign of King Anawrahta of Pagan. He is portrayed standing on a pedestal with a topknot, his left hand raised and holding a staff in his right.

References

16
Deaths from leprosy